Pascal Mendy (born 11 January 1979) is a Senegalese former footballer.

Career
A former Dynamo Moscow player, Mendy signed for Kaunas in February 2007. After Kaunas was demoted from A Lyga, Mendy joined the Belarusian Premier League side Partizan Minsk, another club owned by Romanov.

External links
 
 

1979 births
Living people
Senegalese footballers
Association football defenders
Senegalese expatriate footballers
Expatriate footballers in Russia
Expatriate footballers in Lithuania
Expatriate footballers in Belarus
Senegal international footballers
FC Dynamo Moscow players
FBK Kaunas footballers
ASC Jeanne d'Arc players
Russian Premier League players
FC Partizan Minsk players
FC Dynamo Brest players
FC Torpedo-BelAZ Zhodino players
Mbour Petite-Côte FC players